36th Regiment or 36th Infantry Regiment may refer to:

Infantry regiments
36th Infantry Regiment (Poland), a unit of the Polish Army
36th Sikhs, a unit of the British Indian Army
36th (Herefordshire) Regiment of Foot, a former unit of the British Army
36th Infantry Regiment (United States), a unit of the United States Army

Cavalry regiments
36th Jacob's Horse, a unit of the British Indian Army

Engineering regiments
 36 Engineer Regiment (United Kingdom), a unit of the British Army's Royal Engineers

Aviation regiments
36th Special Aviation Regiment, a unit of the Polish Air Force

American Civil War regiments
36th Regiment Alabama Infantry
36th Illinois Volunteer Infantry Regiment
36th Indiana Infantry Regiment
36th New York Infantry
36th Ohio Infantry
36th Virginia Infantry
36th Wisconsin Volunteer Infantry Regiment

See also
 36 Signal Regiment (disambiguation)
 36th Division (disambiguation)
 36th Brigade (disambiguation)
 36 Squadron (disambiguation)